Rafael Garcia (born December 19, 1988) is an American former soccer player.

Garcia was recruited by LA Galaxy back in the year 2012 and this last January he signed a new contract extending his position on the team through the year 2017.

Career
Garcia, who describes himself as a hard worker, began his career as a defensive midfielder but started the first two games of the 2017 season at right back. Previously he had captained LA Galaxy II, known colloquially as "Los Dos."

Honors
MLS Cup: 2012, 2014

Personal life
Garcia is married and has two children.

References

External links
 
 Cal State Northridge bio

1988 births
Living people
American soccer players
Cal State Northridge Matadors men's soccer players
LA Galaxy players
LA Galaxy II players
New York Cosmos B players
Las Vegas Lights FC players
OKC Energy FC players
Soccer players from Los Angeles
LA Galaxy draft picks
Major League Soccer players
USL Championship players
National Premier Soccer League players
Association football midfielders
People from Granada Hills, Los Angeles
American sportspeople of Mexican descent